The Surface Laptop Go 2 is an upgrade to the Surface Laptop Go. It is a mid-range portable computer with adequate capabilities for everyday PC use that is part of the company's Surface line of personal computing devices. The newer 11th-gen Intel Core i5-1135G7 processor and slightly enhanced 128 GB basic storage will be the laptop's key highlights. Microsoft announced the Surface Laptop Go 2 in a new Sage color on June 1, 2022.

Configuration

Features 

 11th Generation Intel® Core™ 1135G7 Processor
 Intel Iris Xe GPU.
 Preinstalled Operating system: Windows 11 Home
 12.4-inch PixelSense 1536 x 1024 (148 ppi) display with a 3:2 aspect ratio
 Up to 13.5 hours battery life
 Metal finish
 Full size keyboard, with 1.3 mm of travel
 Fingerprint Power Button with One Touch sign-in through Windows Hello (select models only)
 New Sage color option

Hardware 
The Surface Laptop Go 2 is an update to the Surface Laptop Go. Made with an aluminum top and a polycarbonate composite resin system with glass fiber and 30% postconsumer recycled content base. Claimed to have an improved battery life of up to 13.5 hours. A new Sage color is added to the device in addition to Platinum, Ice Blue and Sandstone colors.

It still has a 12.4-inch "PixelSense" Display at 1536 × 1024 using a 3:2 aspect ratio with 10-point touch but without Surface Pen support.

The Surface Laptop Go 2 uses an eleventh-generation Intel Core i5 processor with Intel Iris Xe Graphics. The base model of the device will now have a 4 GB RAM and 128 GB of storage, up from 64 GB of the previous model.

The device has 1 USB-C and 1 USB-A port, alongside a headphone jack and a Surface Connect port for charging. The laptop also has Wi-Fi 6 and Bluetooth 5.

Select models have a fingerprint power button with Windows Hello.

Software 

Surface Laptop Go models ship with a pre-installed 64-bit version of Windows 11 Home and a 30-day trial of Microsoft Office 365. Business models come pre-installed with Windows 11 Pro.

Timeline

References

External links 

 
 

Go
Computer-related introductions in 2022